John Edward Stride (11 July 1936 – 20 April 2018) was an English actor best known for his television work in the 1970s.

Stride was born in London, the son of Margaret (née Prescott) and Alfred Teneriffe Stride. He attended Alleyn's School, Dulwich, and trained at RADA, where he met his first wife, Virginia Stride (née Thomas).

He made his first, uncredited, screen appearance in the film, Sink the Bismarck! (1960). He also played the role of Bob, the barman, in the film Bitter Harvest (1963), based on the trilogy 20,000 Streets Under the Sky by Patrick Hamilton. He made his West End debut in February 1959 in Five Finger Exercise. Directed by John Gielgud, the show featured another debutante, Juliet Mills, aged 17. It ran at the Comedy Theatre for 608 performances. He appeared at the Old Vic as Romeo in Franco Zeffirelli's long-running production of Romeo and Juliet, first staged in 1960, with Judi Dench, and also as Prince Hal in Henry IV, Part 1.

At the end of the 1960s, he played Rosencrantz at the Old Vic, in the National Theatre Company's production of Tom Stoppard's play Rosencrantz and Guildenstern Are Dead. Stride appeared in two Shakespeare production during the 1970s made for the large and small screen respectively. In Roman Polanski's version of Macbeth (1971) he played the role of Ross. For the BBC Television Shakespeare production of Shakespeare's Henry VIII (1979), he was cast in the title role.

Stride developed a career in popular television drama series. In the Yorkshire Television series The Main Chance (1969–75), he played the solicitor, David Main, the television role with which he became most closely associated; it ran for four series. A later series made by the same ITV franchise holder with Stride and Julia Foster in the lead, Wilde Alliance (1978), lasted for only one series. He also played one of the main parts in the BBC's adaptation of Kingsley Amis's novel The Old Devils (1992). BBC Producer Adrian Mourby wrote "John Stride actually played the lead in The Old Devils, the character of Alun Weaver. The part fitted him perfectly. He was a fine actor although self-destructively volatile. When I proposed to Penguin Books that the tie-in paperback was re-issued with the Old Devils themselves on the front cover and John on the back – because Alun was an interloper and catalyst in their world – he rang me up late at night and threatened to kill me. Up until that point John was making the life of the production manager hell. Then he turned his attention to me and was unremittingly unpleasant on set. It was almost as if he needed someone to hate in order to generate the energy that infused his acting. I'm pleased to say that he never attempted to actually carry out his threat and I remained impressed by his skill as an actor. He was vital to the success of this mini-series. It did strike me however that his pyrotechnic volatility might be why he only worked once with each of the producers who admired him."

Stride died on 20 April 2018, aged 81 in a care home after being discharged from Sandford Ward, at the Fulbrook Centre, Oxford.

Filmography

References

External links

 Performances in the Theatre Archive, University of Bristol

1936 births
2018 deaths
English male film actors
English male television actors
People educated at Alleyn's School
Alumni of RADA
Male actors from London
Place of death missing